AD 95 (XCV) was a common year starting on Thursday (link will display the full calendar) of the Julian calendar, the 95th Year of the Anno Domini (AD) designation, the 95th year of the 1st millennium, the 95th year of the end of the 1st century, and the 5th year of the 10th decade. In the Roman Empire, it was known as the Year of the Consulship of Augustus and Clemens (or, less frequently, year 848 Ab urbe condita). The denomination AD 95 for this year has been used since the early medieval period, when the Anno Domini calendar era became the prevalent method in Europe for naming years.

Events

By place

Roman Empire 
 Emperor Domitian and Titus Flavius Clemens become Roman Consuls.
 Domitian executes senators out of paranoiac fears that they are plotting to kill him.
 The Roman consul Manius Acilius Glabrio is ordered by Domitian to descend into the arena of the Colosseum to fight a lion. After he kills the animal, Domitian banishes and puts him to death.

By topic

Epidemic 
 In Rome a severe form of malaria appears in the farm districts and will continue for the next 500 years, taking out of cultivation the fertile land of the Campagna, whose market gardens supply the city with fresh products. The fever drives small groups of farmers into the crowded city, bringing the malaria with them, and lowers Rome's live-birth rate while rates elsewhere in the empire are rising.

Religion 
 Latest date for the writing of the Book of Revelation.
 Possible date for the writing of the First Epistle of Peter.

Births 
 Appian of Alexandria, Greek historian and writer (d. 165)

Deaths 
 Avilius of Alexandria, patriarch of Alexandria
 Epaphroditus, Roman freedman of Nero (executed)
 Flavius Scorpus, Roman charioteer (b. c. AD 68)
 Manius Acilius Glabrio, Roman politician (executed)

References 

0095